Wild Flowers is a 2022 Spanish-French film directed by Jaime Rosales which stars Anna Castillo alongside Oriol Pla, Quim Àvila, and Lluís Marquès.

Plot 
The plot tracks Julia, a 22-year-old single mother with a strong zest for life who falls romantically for a conflictive man, Óscar, also meeting another two men with different backgrounds.

Cast

Production 
The screenplay was penned by Jaime Rosales and Bárbara Díez. The film is a Fresdeval Films, A Contracorriente Films, Oberon Media and Luxbox production, and it had participation from RTVE, TV3 and Movistar+ and funding from ICAA, ICEC and Creative Europe's MEDIA. Filming began in Barcelona by February 2021. Shooting locations also included Mataró, Banyoles and Melilla. Hélène Louvart worked as cinematographer.

Release 
The film was selected for screening at the 70th San Sebastián International Film Festival's official selection, where it was presented on 17 September 2022. Distributed by A Contracorriente Films, it was theatrically released in Spain on 14 October 2022.

Reception 
Jonathan Holland of ScreenDaily considered that the film signals "an interesting step towards the mainstream" by Rosales, featuring a "captivating, sometimes wrenching, and always relatable central performance" by Castillo.

Top ten lists 
The film appeared on a number of critics' top ten lists of the best Spanish films of 2022:

Accolades 

|-
| align = "center" | 2022 || 28th Forqué Awards || Best Film Actress || Anna Castillo ||  || 
|-
| rowspan = "11" align = "center" | 2023 || rowspan = "2" | 15th Gaudí Awards || Best Actress || Anna Castillo ||  || rowspan = "2" | 
|-
| Best Actor || Oriol Pla Solina|| 
|-
| rowspan = "3" | 10th Feroz Awards || Best Actress in a Film || Anna Castillo ||  || rowspan = "3" | 
|-
| Best Supporting Actor in a Film || Oriol Pla || 
|-
| Best Film Poster || Gonzalo Rute, Quim Vives || 
|-
| rowspan = "3" | 78th CEC Medals || Best Actress || Anna Castillo ||  || rowspan = "3" align = "center" | 
|-
| Best Supporting Actor || Manolo Solo || 
|-
| Best New Actor || Lluís Marqués || 
|-
| 37th Goya Awards || Best Actress || Anna Castillo ||  || 
|-
| 31st Actors and Actresses Union Awards || Best Film Actor in a Minor Role || Manolo Solo ||  || 
|-
| 67th Sant Jordi Awards || Best Actress || Anna Castillo ||  || 
|}

See also 
 List of Spanish films of 2022

References 

Films shot in Barcelona
Films shot in the province of Barcelona
Films shot in the province of Girona
Spanish drama films
French drama films
2020s Spanish films
2020s Spanish-language films
2022 drama films
2022 films
2020s French films
Films shot in Melilla
Films about single parent families